Pok To Yan (literally "Thin Razor's Edge"), is a mountain on Lantau Island, Hong Kong, with a height of  above sea level.

Geology

Pok To Yan is formed by Volcanic rocks, much like many of the tallest mountains on Lantau Island, such as Lantau Peak.

Flora
Pok To Yan and neighbouring Por Kai Shan were designated together a "Site of Special Scientific Interest" in 1994. According to the local government, Pok To Yan has "over 200 species of native plants." and "a number of rare and protected indigenous plants".

Geography
To the northwest is Tung Chung, while to the south is Sunset Peak.

See also
 List of mountains, peaks and hills in Hong Kong

References

Lantau Island